Operation Epsilon was the codename of a program in which Allied forces near the end of World War II detained ten German scientists who were thought to have worked on Nazi Germany's nuclear program.  The scientists were captured between May 1 and June 30, 1945, as part of the Allied Alsos Mission, mainly as part of its Operation Big sweep through southwestern Germany.

They were interned at Farm Hall, a bugged house in Godmanchester, near Cambridge, England, from July 3, 1945, to January 3, 1946. The primary goal of the program was to determine how close Nazi Germany had been to constructing an atomic bomb by listening to their conversations.

List of scientists
The following German scientists were captured and detained during Operation Epsilon:
 Erich Bagge
 Kurt Diebner
 Walther Gerlach
 Otto Hahn
 Paul Harteck
 Werner Heisenberg
 Horst Korsching
 Max von Laue
 Carl Friedrich von Weizsäcker
 Karl Wirtz

Transfer to England 
The scientists captured in Germany by the Alsos Mission were flown to England. Harteck said in a 1967 interview that some scientists had not adjusted to losing their German elite status. When von Laue was told they were on a plane to England tomorrow, he said "impossible .... tomorrow is my colloquium .... Couldn’t you have the airplane come some other time?" Gerlach expected respect for the "plenipotentiary for nuclear physics" in Germany; he was shocked when he asked for a glass of water and was told by the guard to "look for an empty can in the trash barrel." Harteck joked with the British officer when he saw the plane taking them to England that if an "accident" was planned they would have used an older plane. 

Farm Hall, a country house in Godmanchester, Huntingdonshire (now in Cambridgeshire), had been used by M.I.6 and S.O.E for agents who were to be flown into occupied Europe from RAF Tempsford, but was now vacant. R V Jones suggested to Stewart Menzies that German nuclear physicists then held in France at an American internment camp known as “Dustbin” (partly because he was told that an American general had said that the best way of dealing with the post-war nuclear physics problem in Germany was to shoot all their nuclear physicists). He also recommended to Menzies, the head of M.I.6, that the house be fitted with microphones to gauge the physicists' reactions to Allied progress with the dropping of the bomb.

Farm Hall transcripts
On July 6, the microphones picked up the following conversation between Werner Heisenberg and Kurt Diebner, both of whom had worked on the German nuclear project and had been seized as part of the Allied Alsos Mission, Diebner in Berlin and Heisenberg in Urfeld:

All of the scientists expressed shock when informed of the atomic bombing of Hiroshima on August 6, 1945. Some first doubted that the report was genuine. They were told initially of an official announcement that an "atomic bomb" had been dropped on Hiroshima, with no mention of uranium or nuclear fission. Harteck said that he would have understood the words "uranium" or "nuclear (fission) bomb", but he had worked with atomic hydrogen and atomic oxygen and thought that American scientists might have succeeded in stabilising a high concentration of (separate) atoms; such a bomb would have had a tenfold increase over a conventional bomb. 

The scientists then contemplated how the American bomb was made and why Germany did not produce one. The transcripts seem to indicate that the physicists, in particular Heisenberg, had either overestimated the amount of enriched uranium that an atomic bomb would require or consciously overstated it, and that the German project was at best in a very early, theoretical stage of thinking about how atomic bombs would work.

Some of the scientists indicated that they were happy that they had not been able to build a nuclear bomb for Adolf Hitler, while others more sympathetic to the Nazi party (Diebner and Gerlach) were dismayed at having failed. Otto Hahn, one of those who were grateful that Germany had not built a bomb, chided those who had worked on the German project, saying "If the Americans have a uranium bomb then you're all second-raters."

All were physicists except for Hahn and Harteck, who were chemists, and all except Max von Laue had participated in the German nuclear project. During his incarceration in Farm Hall, Hahn was awarded the 1944 Nobel Prize for Chemistry "for his discovery of the fission of heavy nuclei".

A group of eight people, including Peter Ganz, led by Major T. H. Rittner, was responsible for eavesdropping, recording, copying and translating. Only relevant technical or political information, about ten percent of all words heard, was recorded, transcribed and translated. The recordings were made with six to eight machines on shellac-coated metal discs. After the selective transcriptions had been made, the discs and recordings were permanently destroyed.

The transcripts were sent as reports to London and the American consulate, and were then forwarded to General Leslie Groves of the Manhattan Project  in 24 reports, over 250 pages.

Dramatisation of Farm Hall 

In February 1992 the transcripts were declassified and published.  The events at Farm Hall were dramatised on BBC Radio 4 on 15 June 2010, in "Nuclear Reactions", written by Adam Ganz, son of one of the interpreters, Peter Ganz.

A play titled Operation Epsilon by Alan Brody, largely based on the transcripts, opened on March 7, 2013, in Cambridge, Massachusetts. A staged reading of the play Farm Hall by David C. Cassidy, was presented on February 15, 2013, in the Science & the Arts program at The Graduate Center of the City University of New York.  A second reading was performed on March 20, 2013, at the annual March meeting of The American Physical Society in Baltimore, Maryland. A further adaptation, Farm Hall by Katherine M. Moar, was performed as a staged reading at the Theatre Royal, Bath on September 21, 2019, and is to be revived as a full production at the Jermyn Street Theatre and the Theatre Royal, Bath in 2023.

On 24 February 1992 the BBC broadcast a Horizon drama-documentary entitled Hitler's Bomb based on the events at Farm Hall and examining the reasons for the failure of the German nuclear weapons program.  The documentary was produced by David Sington with dramatic reconstructions written by Nick Perry.

See also

 Trent Park, a similarly bugged house where captured German generals were luxuriously housed during the war and their unguarded conversations monitored
 Latimer House and Wilton Park Estate, similar facilities used to monitor other captured German officers during the war before transferring them to POW camps
 Operation Paperclip
 Combined Services Detailed Interrogation Centre
 Russian Alsos

Notes

References
 
 Operation Big The Race to Stop Hitler's A-Bomb, Colin Brown, Amberley Publishing 2016,  
 
 
 
  (1967 interviews with Werner Heisenberg and Paul Harteck)

External links
 Transcript of Surreptitiously Taped Conversations among German Nuclear Physicists at Farm Hall (August 6-7, 1945), German History in Documents and Images
 Annotated bibliography for Farm Hall from the Alsos Digital Library for Nuclear Issues
 Archival entry for the original transcripts, includes notes on their provenance
 Programme for staged reading of the Farm Hall Transcripts, Royal Society of Edinburgh, 24 April 2009

 
History of Huntingdonshire
Epsilon
Intelligence operations
Military history of Cambridgeshire
Nuclear program of Nazi Germany
Science and technology in Cambridgeshire